Caladenia huegelii, commonly known as the grand spider orchid is a species of orchid endemic to the south-west of Western Australia. It has a single, hairy leaf and up to three relatively large red, green and cream-coloured flowers which have "split-hairs" on the sides of the labellum.

Description
The flowers are pale greenish-yellow with red markings and the lateral sepals have light brown to yellow, club-like glandular tips. Flowering occurs from September to late October.

Taxonomy and naming
Caladenia huegelii was first described in 1871 by Heinrich Reichenbach from a specimen collected near the Swan River and the description was published in Beitrage zur Systematischen Pflanzenkunde. The specific epithet (huegelii) honours Baron Charles von Hügel.

Distribution and habitat
The grand spider orchid occurs between Perth and Capel in the Jarrah Forest and Swan Coastal Plain biogeographic regions where it grows in deep sandy soil in woodland.

Conservation
Caladenia huegelii occurs in an area undergoing urbanisation and many populations of this once-common species have been lost. Of the 33 known popopulations containing about 1,500 plants, 85% of the plants are in four of these populations. Threats to the species include habitat loss due to urbanisation, weed invasion and disease caused by Phytophthora cinnamomi. The species is classified as "Threatened Flora (Declared Rare Flora — Extant)" by the Western Australian Government Department of Parks and Wildlife  and it has also been listed as "Endangered" (EN) under the Australian Government Environment Protection and Biodiversity Conservation Act 1999 (EPBC Act).

References

huegelii
Orchids of Western Australia
Endemic orchids of Australia
Plants described in 1871
Endemic flora of Western Australia